Truck Full of Ducks is a 2018 children's picture book written and illustrated by Ross Burach about a duck delivery service.

Reception
A review in School Library Journal of Truck Full of Ducks wrote "Children will delight in the extreme silliness of this story and will repeatedly pore over the detailed, colorful, and quirky illustrations.".

Truck Full of Ducks has also been reviewed by Kirkus Reviews, Publishers Weekly, and Booklist.

References

External links

Library holdings of Truck Full of Ducks

2018 children's books
American picture books
Books about ducks
Scholastic Corporation books